Sir Henry Bedingfield  (21 May 1586 – 22 November 1657), of Oxburgh Hall, Norfolk, was an English Member of Parliament.

Life
He was the eldest son of Thomas Bedingfield of Oxburgh, who he succeeded in 1590, and the great-grandson of Sir Henry Bedingfield. His mother was Frances, daughter and coheiress of John Jernegan of Somerleyton. After his father's death she married secondly as his second wife Sir Henry Jerningham (d. 15 June 1619) of Cossey, the father of the first Jerningham baronet.

Henry Bedingfield was knighted some time after 21 July 1604. He was a Member (MP) of the Parliament of England for Norfolk in 1614. He was the Sheriff of Norfolk in 1620–1621.

He was accused, with some justification, of being a Catholic recusant and led a Royalist contingent of East Anglian Catholics during the Civil War. He escaped to Holland shortly after Henrietta Maria left England in early 1642. Returning from exile under pressure in 1646 he was committed to the Tower of London in 1647, being released under a general pardon in 1649. His Norfolk estates, excluding Oxburgh, were confiscated and sold.

He married twice and left several sons and daughters.  His eldest son, Thomas, also fought as a Royalist and after being captured at Lincoln served two years in gaol before being exiled, and his son-in-law, Colonel Robert Apreece, was killed after the Parliamentarians captured Lincoln in 1643. Two other sons, Henry and William, both fought as royalists and escaped overseas and another son, Edmund, was a canon at Lierre in Belgium. After the Restoration of the Monarchy in 1660, Henry, who had inherited Oxburgh Hall, was created a baronet to recompense him for the family's losses during the Civil war.

Children
He married 1) Mary, daughter of Lord William Howard of Naworth; 2) Elizabeth (1590 – 11 April 1662), daughter and coheiress of Peter Houghton of Houghton Towers in Lancashire, Esquire, Alderman and Sheriff of London. His second wife Elizabeth Houghton, Lady Bedingfield died 11 April 1662, and is buried at Oxburgh.

Her portrait was as Oxburgh Hall, where it was described in the following manner:Body full, face turned slightly towards the sinister, small eyes, bright colour (very pretty), hair puffed out all round the head, tiny lock on the forehead, she is wearing pearl ear-drops.  Dress :  Black, long rather tigh-waisted bodice, low with V-shape opening, leg of mutton sleeves, point lace round the opening over velvet, high Elizabethan ruff collar, turned-back lace cuffs, hooped skirt, a double rope of pearls round the shoulders with an ornament in front, from which a big loop hangs, large pearl necklace, pearl bracelet on right wrist, black string with a ring on the left wrist ; the left hand is holding knob of the chain on the sinister side, the right hand is doubled on the hip.  On the sinister side is a black velvet-covered Jacobean chair with gold lace and dark blue, also gold edge and tassel.  V.L.  Age 20.  Date 1610.  Possibly by Van Somer.Another portrait was of the elder Elizabeth:Body and face turned towards the sinister, dark eyes full, very slight brows, long nose, thin lips, dimple chin, a black crepe hood with peak in front, is over the head to the shoulders.  Dress :  Black, with short sleeves, tied above the elbow, with fulled elbow-sleeves, and very deep white collar from neck over shoulders.  M.  In sham oval.  Age 60.  Date 1650.  A Widow's costume.  On it : "Elizabeth 2d wife of Sir Henry Bedingfeld, and da : of Peter Houghton of Houghton Towers, ob 1662." Children of Sir Henry Bedingfield and Mary Howard, first marriage:

 Colonel Thomas Bedingfield of Oxborough, eldest son and heir, of full age in 1657. Ob. s.p. 26 April 1655. He married Mary, daughter of William Brooksby, Esquire. Their marriage settlement was dated 21 February 1625.

Children of Sir Henry Bedingfield and Elizabeth Houghton, second marriage:

 Sir Henry Bedingfield, 1st Baronet. He succeeded his half-brother and was created a baronet in 1660. Died 24 February 1684. He married Margaret, daughter and heiress of Edward Paston, Esquire. Margaret died 14 January 1702, aged 84
 Edmund Bedingfield (d.1666+), a Canon at Lierre Brabant, where he died
 William Bedingfield, Captain in the Guards. Will dated 21 March 1684, then of St. Giles', Norwich. Will proved 16 February 1685
 John, 4th son, died ob. s.p. 1685
 Jane, m. Colonel Apreece, of Huntshire
 Frances, m. Michael Tymperley of Hintlesham
 Mary, m. Thomas Eyre of Hassop in Derbyshire
 Elizabeth m. Colonel William Cobbe, of Sandringham, a descendant of Francis Mountford, ob. 1698, bur. in 1698, buried in St. Giles', Norwich
 Anne, m. Richard Martyn of Long Melford

Monument 
A beautiful monument was erected to him, his second wife, and his son in Bedingfield Chapel by his daughter-in-law Margaret Paston, Lady Bedingfield.

References

1586 births
1657 deaths
Members of the Parliament of England for Norfolk
English MPs 1614
Knights Bachelor
High Sheriffs of Norfolk